The 2016–17 Cyprus Basketball Division A was the 50th season of the Cyprus Basketball Division A, the top-tier level men's professional basketball league on Cyprus. The season started on 29 October 2016, and ended in May 2017. AEK Larnaca was the defending champion, and lost the title to Keravnos in the finals.

Competition format
After the exclusion of Omonia, and the relegation of Anagennisi, only six teams would join the regular season.

Regular season

League table

Results

First round

Second round

Playoffs

Bracket

Semi-finals

Game 1

Game 2

Game 3

Game 4

Finals

References

External links
Cyprus Basketball Federation

Cyprus
Basketball
Basketball
Cyprus Basketball Division 1